Nicholas Burton was an A.M.E. Church minister, sheriff, and politician in Louisiana. He served in the Louisiana House of Representatives in 1877 and 1878.

He was involved in a disputed election with Cain Sartain.

See also
African-American officeholders during and following the Reconstruction era

References

Louisiana sheriffs
African Methodist Episcopal Church clergy
Year of birth missing
Year of death missing
19th-century American politicians
African-American state legislators in Louisiana
African-American politicians during the Reconstruction Era